Annette Wyrwoll (born 14 November 1955) is a German former equestrian. She competed in the individual eventing at the 2000 Summer Olympics.

References

External links
 

1955 births
Living people
German female equestrians
Olympic equestrians of Germany
Equestrians at the 2000 Summer Olympics
People from Neuwied
Sportspeople from Rhineland-Palatinate